The Laramie Plains Civic Center was established in 1982 in the old East Side School in Laramie, Wyoming.  The original portion of the complex was built in 1878 and was the oldest public school building in Wyoming. It was expanded in 1928 and 1939, and closed as a school in 1979. The civic center provides performing, studio and gallery space for visual and performing arts, as well as office and small business space.

History
The East Side School was established as a high school in 1878, the oldest purpose-built school building in Wyoming. The cornerstone ceremony was a major public event, and was apparently notable for an absence of public drunkenness on that day. The school was expanded in 1928 and 1939. It became a junior high school when a new high school was built and finally closed in 1978. Plans were immediately put into place to adapt the building as a community center, which opened in 1982.

Description
The original Italianate brick school had four classrooms on the main level and two above, resembling the first Laramie courthouse. The 1928 expansion was designed by architect Wilbur Hitchcock and was built in a stripped-down Gothic style, with pointed arch accents in limestone panels in an otherwise plain facade. It added classrooms, an auditorium and a gymnasium. The murals were painted by Florence Ware, whose father Walter E. Ware assisted in the design and took over architectural duties after Hitchcock was killed in a car accident in California.

The East Side School was placed on the National Register of Historic Places on March 17, 1981, as part of its transition to its current role as a civic center.

References

External links
 Laramie Plains Civic Center website
 East Side School at the Wyoming State Historic Preservation Office

National Register of Historic Places in Albany County, Wyoming
Gothic Revival architecture in Wyoming
Buildings and structures completed in 1878
Schools in Albany County, Wyoming
Arts centers in Wyoming